An inhalational anesthetic is a chemical compound possessing general anesthetic properties that can be delivered via inhalation. They are administered through a face mask, laryngeal mask airway or tracheal tube connected to an anesthetic vaporiser and an anesthetic delivery system. Agents of significant contemporary clinical interest include volatile anesthetic agents such as isoflurane, sevoflurane and desflurane, as well as certain anesthetic gases such as nitrous oxide and xenon.

List of inhalational anaesthetic agents

Currently-used agents
 Desflurane
 Isoflurane
 Nitrous oxide
 Sevoflurane
 Xenon

Previously-used agents
Although some of these are still used in clinical practice and in research, the following anaesthetic agents are primarily of historical interest in developed countries:

 Acetylene
 Chloroethane (ethyl chloride)
 Chloroform
 Cryofluorane
 Cyclopropane
 Diethyl ether
 Divinyl ether
 Enflurane
 Ethylene
 Fluroxene
 Halothane (still widely used in the developing world and is on the WHO Model List of Essential Medicines)
 Methoxyflurane (still used currently as an analgesic)
 Methoxypropane
 Trichloroethylene
 Vinyl chloride

Never-marketed agents
 Aliflurane
 Halopropane
 Norflurane
 Roflurane
 Synthane
 Teflurane

Volatile anaesthetics

Volatile anaesthetic agents share the property of being liquid at room temperature, but evaporating easily for administration by inhalation. The volatile anesthetics used in the developed world today include: Desflurane, isoflurane and sevoflurane. Other agents widely used in the past include ether, chloroform, enflurane, halothane, methoxyflurane. All of these agents share the property of being quite hydrophobic (i.e., as liquids, they are not freely miscible with water, and as gases they dissolve in oils better than in water). 

The ideal volatile anaesthetic agent offers smooth and reliable induction and maintenance of general anaesthesia with minimal effects on other organ systems. In addition it is odorless or pleasant to inhale; safe for all ages and in pregnancy; not metabolised; rapid in onset and offset; potent; and safe for exposure to operating room staff. It is  also cheap to manufacture; easy to transport and store, with a long shelf life; easy to administer and monitor with existing equipment; stable to light, plastics, metals, rubber and soda lime; non-flammable and environmentally safe. None of the agents currently in use are ideal, although many have some of the desirable characteristics. For example, sevoflurane is pleasant to inhale and is rapid in onset and offset. It is also safe for all ages. However, it is expensive (approximately 3 to 5 times more expensive than isoflurane), and approximately half as potent as isoflurane.

Gases
Other gases or vapors which produce general anaesthesia by inhalation include nitrous oxide, cyclopropane and xenon. These are stored in gas cylinders and administered using flowmeters, rather than vaporisers. Cyclopropane is explosive and is no longer used for safety reasons, although otherwise it was found to be an excellent anaesthetic. Xenon is odourless and rapid in onset, but is expensive and requires specialized equipment to administer and monitor. Nitrous oxide, even at 80% concentration, does not quite produce surgical level anaesthesia in most people at standard atmospheric pressure, so it must be used as an adjunct anaesthetic, along with other agents.

Hyperbaric anaesthesia
Under hyperbaric conditions (pressures above normal atmospheric pressure), other gases such as nitrogen, and noble gases such as argon, krypton, and xenon become anaesthetics. When inhaled at high partial pressures (more than about 4 bar, encountered at depths below about 30 metres in scuba diving), nitrogen begins to act as an anaesthetic agent, causing nitrogen narcosis. However, the minimum alveolar concentration (MAC) for nitrogen is not achieved until pressures of about 20 to 30 atm (bar) are attained. Argon is slightly more than twice as anaesthetic as nitrogen per unit of partial pressure (see argox). Xenon however is a usable anaesthetic at 80% concentration and normal atmospheric pressure.

Neurological theories of action

The full mechanism of action of volatile anaesthetic agents is unknown and has been the subject of intense debate. "Anesthetics have been used for 160 years, and how they work is one of the great mysteries of neuroscience," says anaesthesiologist James Sonner of the University of California, San Francisco. Anaesthesia research "has been for a long time a science of untestable hypotheses," notes Neil L. Harrison of Cornell University.

"Most of the injectable anesthetics appear to act on a single molecular target," says Sonner. "It looks like inhaled anesthetics act on multiple molecular targets. That makes it a more difficult problem to pick apart."

The possibility of anaesthesia by the inert gas argon in particular (even at 10 to 15 bar) suggests that the mechanism of action of volatile anaesthetics is an effect best described by physical chemistry, and not a chemical bonding action. However, the agent may bind to a receptor with a weak interaction. A physical interaction such as swelling of nerve cell membranes from gas solution in the lipid bilayer may be operative. Notably, the gases hydrogen, helium, and neon have not been found to have anaesthetic properties at any pressure. Helium at high pressures produces nervous irritation ("anti-anaesthesia"), suggesting that the anaesthetic mechanism(s) may be operated in reverse by this gas (i.e., nerve membrane compression). Also, some halogenated ethers (such as flurothyl) also possess this "anti-anaesthetic" effect, providing further evidence for this theory.

History
Paracelsus developed an inhalational anaesthetic in 1540. He used sweet oil of vitriol (prepared by Valerius Cordus and named Aether by Frobenius): used to feed fowl: “it was taken even by chickens and they fall asleep from it for a while but awaken later without harm”. Subsequently, about 40 years later, in 1581, Giambattista Delia Porta demonstrated the use of ether on humans although it was not employed for any type of surgical anesthesia.

In modern medicine, Dr. Horace Wells used nitrous oxide for his own dental extraction in 1844. However his attempt to replicate these results at Massachusetts General Hospital (MGH) resulted in a partial anesthetic and was deemed a failure. 

William T.G. Morton is credited with successfully demonstrating surgical anesthesia for the first time on October 16th, 1846, at MGH. Following this event, the use of ether and other volatile anesthetics became widespread in Western medicine.

See also
 A.C.E. mixture - a mixture of ethanol, chloroform and diethyl ether
 Anaesthetic
 Concentration effect
 Second gas effect

References

General anesthetics
GABAA receptor positive allosteric modulators
NMDA receptor antagonists